This is a list of Mughal empresses. Most of these empresses were either from branches of the Timurid dynasty or from the royal houses of the Rajputs. Alongside Mughal emperors, these empresses played a role in the building up and rule of the Mughal Empire in South Asia, from the early 16th century to the early 18th century. The Mughal Empire mainly corresponds in the present day to the modern countries of India, Pakistan, Afghanistan, Bangladesh, Iran and Nepal.

References

Sources

 

 
 

Empresses
Mughal
th:รายพระนามพระอัครมเหสีในพระมหากษัตริย์อินเดีย